Collom is a surname. Notable people with the surname include:

 Jack Collom (1931–2017), American poet and essayist
 Rose E. Collom (1870–1956), American botanist and plant collector

See also
Collomb